The 1955 Tasmanian state election was held on 19 February 1955.

Retiring Members

Liberal
Neil Campbell MHA (Wilmot)
Archibald Park MHA (Franklin)

House of Assembly
Sitting members are shown in bold text. Tickets that elected at least one MHA are highlighted in the relevant colour. Successful candidates are indicated by an asterisk (*).

Bass
Six seats were up for election. The Labor Party was defending three seats. The Liberal Party was defending three seats.

Darwin
Six seats were up for election. The Labor Party was defending three seats. The Liberal Party was defending three seats.

Denison
Six seats were up for election. The Labor Party was defending three seats. The Liberal Party was defending two seats. One seat had been won at the previous election by independent candidate Bill Wedd; he had resigned in 1953 to run for the Legislative Council and was replaced by fellow independent Leo McPartlan, who at this election ran for Franklin.

Franklin
Six seats were up for election. The Labor Party was defending three seats. The Liberal Party was defending three seats.

Wilmot
Six seats were up for election. The Labor Party was defending three seats. The Liberal Party was defending three seats.

See also
 Members of the Tasmanian House of Assembly, 1950–1955
 Members of the Tasmanian House of Assembly, 1955–1956

References
Tasmanian Parliamentary Library

Candidates for Tasmanian state elections